Flight 971 (Spanish: Vuelo 971) is a 1953 Spanish drama film directed by Rafael J. Salvia and starring José Nieto, Germán Cobos and Antonio Casas.

The film's sets were designed by Antonio Simont. Some scenes were shot at Madrid's Barajas Airport.

Cast
 José Nieto as Comandante Pedro Zubiri  
 Germán Cobos as Primer oficial  
 Antonio Casas as Giner 
 Santiago Rivero as Radiooperador  
 Raúl Cancio as Primer sobrecargo  
 Antonio Ferrandis as Segundo sobrecargo  
 Julia Martínez as Matilde  
 Joan Capri as Camarero  
 Enrique Diosdado as Emilio Fraga  
 José Bódalo as Hugo Carrara  
 Doris Duranti as Liliana Musso 
 María Dolores Pradera as Mónica  
 Xan das Bolas as Padre 
 Carmen Cabajos as Madre  
 Fernando Sanclemente as Niño  
 Pilar Sanclemente as Niña 
 Marisa de Leza as Hija del presidente Zavala  
 Milagros Leal as Señora creyente  
 Joaquín Roa as Eduardo Valenzuela  
 Aníbal Vela as Concertista  
 Adolfo Marsillach as Doctor  
 Beatriz Aguirre as Enfermera  
 Ángela Pla as Etelvina de Campollano y de Bernáldez de Carvajal  
 Miguel Gómez as José García  
 Maruchi Fresno as Carmen Valverde de Galván  
 Otto Sirgo as Marcos Galván  
 Adriano Domínguez as Hijo de la mujer enferma  
 María Francés as Mujer enferma  
 Nicolás D. Perchicot as Abuelito  
 Carmen Rodríguez as Abuelita  
 Mike Brendel as Mike Brendel 'El Tigre Americano'  
 Juan Tena as Joven ateo  
 Mateo Guitart as Lector  
 Sergio Orta as Secretario 1  
 Félix Dafauce as Secretario 2  
 Marcelino Ornat as Sr. Solís  
 Vicente Parra as Rafael Azarías

References

Bibliography 
 Bentley, Bernard. A Companion to Spanish Cinema. Boydell & Brewer 2008.

External links 
 

1953 drama films
Spanish drama films
1953 films
1950s Spanish-language films
Films directed by Rafael J. Salvia
Films with screenplays by Rafael J. Salvia
Spanish black-and-white films
1950s Spanish films